Dirk Meusel (born 11 December 1977) is a German rower. He competed in the men's coxless four event at the 2000 Summer Olympics.

References

External links
 

1977 births
Living people
German male rowers
Olympic rowers of Germany
Rowers at the 2000 Summer Olympics
Rowers from Berlin